Celypha atriapex is a moth of the family Tortricidae. It is found in Vietnam.

The wingspan is about 10 mm. The ground colour of the forewings is whitish sprinkled brown with blackish dots along the costa and a blackish-brown apex. The hindwings are grey.

Etymology
The name refers to blackish colour of apex of forewing.

References

Moths described in 2009
Olethreutini
Moths of Asia
Taxa named by Józef Razowski